Iceberg A-81 is an iceberg that calved from the Brunt Ice Shelf in January 2023. The detachment happened near the British-operated Halley Research Station, which is located only 20 km away from the point of rupture. The iceberg is estimated to measure .

The iceberg was first spotted on 22 January by the British Antarctic Survey and was later confirmed by the U.S. National Ice Center (USNIC) using satellite imagery.

As of 27 January 2023, the iceberg was located at 75°40' South and 27°10' West and had a length of 28 nautical miles and width of 25 nautical miles.

References 

Icebergs
2023 in Antarctica
Geography of Antarctica
Bodies of ice